Yeşim Ceren Bozoğlu (born 29 July 1974) is a Turkish actress, director, voice actress and educator.

Biography
A graduate of Dokuz Eylül University with a degree in acting studies, Bozoğlu started her career as a stage actress. Upon graduating, she had her first role in the play Kadınlar and due to her performance, she was chosen by Cumhuriyet newspaper as the "Young Actress of the Year". She later joined the Turkish State Theatres and soon started a career in cinema and television. 

As an actress, she worked with directors such as Semih Kaplanoğlu and Ömer Uğur. She was cast in hit series "Yeditepe İstanbul", "Gülbeyaz", "Sıcak Saatler". She had her breakthrough with her role in the hit medical "Doktorlar" as Fikret and in series the hit comedy series Geniş Aile as "Domuşuk Sevim". She played in sketches theatre "Güldür Güldür Show". She joined the cast of Canım Babam before appearing on TRT 1's youth series Elde Var Hayat series as "Zehra". Subsequently she starred in the 2010 movie Bahtıkara, which was awarded as the Best Film at the İpekyolu Film Festival. 

Aside from her career as an actress, Bozoğlu taught Turkish and English courses at Duru Theatre. She also appeared in the music videos for Mirkelam's Asuman Pansuman and Rober Hatemo's Doludizgin songs. Together with Lale Mansur and Halit Ergenç, she starred in the movie Misafir. She has also written an autobiography on her acting experiences under the title Dersimiz Oyunculuk.

Theatre 
 Gözlerimi Kaparım Vazifemi Yaparım 
 Örümcek Kadının Öpücüğü 
 Tersine Dünya 
 Sessizlik 
 Arthuro Ui'nin Önlenebilir Yükselişi 
 Totlar 
 Oyun Nasıl Oynanmalı

Filmography 
 Hayaller ve Hayatlar - 2022 - Melike
 Annemizi Saklarken - 2021 - Füsun Moran
 Kuruluş: Osman - 2020 - Hazal Hatun
 Yüzleşme - 2019 - Zümrüt Karaca
 Kalbimdeki Deniz - 2016–2018 - Fikriye Yılmaz
 O Hayat Benim - 2014–2015 - Nuran
 Güldür Güldür - 2013 - Oya
 Bebek İşi - 2013 (Rahşan)
 Aldırma Gönül - 2013 - Petek Esrik
 Elde Var Hayat: Sınav - 2012 - Zehra (guest appearance)
 Ateşin Düştüğü Yer - 2012
 Elde Var Hayat - 2011 - Zehra
 Canım Babam - 2011 - Alev
 Geniş Aile - 2009–2011 - Sevim 
 Bahtı Kara - 2009
 Yüreğine Sor - 2009
 Deli Deli Olma - 2008
 Kirpi - 2008 - Dilarasu
 Kısık Ateşte 15 Dakika - 2006 
 Eve Dönüş - 2006 
 Polis - 2006 
 Doktorlar - 2006 - Fikret Eralp
 Beşinci Boyut-Bir Annenin Zor Günleri - 2005 - Zehra
 Alanya Almanya - 2005 
 The İmam - 2005 
 Öteki Gece - 2005 
 Avrupa Yakası - 2004 - Zuhal
 Meleğin Düşüşü - 2004 
 Bir Aşk Hikayesi - 2004 
 İki Genç Kız - 2004 
 Arapsaçı - 2004 
 Günahım Neydi Allahım - 2003 
 Sultan Makamı - 2003 
 Azad - 2002 - Göze
 Gülbeyaz - 2002 - Meryem 
 İngiliz Kemal - 2001 
 Yeditepe İstanbul - 2001 - Nilgün 
 Gece Martıları - 2000 
 Sıcak Saatler - 1998

References

External links 
 
 

1974 births
Actresses from Ankara
Turkish stage actresses
Turkish film actresses
Turkish television actresses
Turkish theatre directors
Turkish voice actresses
Living people
Dokuz Eylül University alumni